Dressed to Kill is a 1928 silent film drama produced and distributed by Fox Film Corporation and starring Mary Astor and Edmund Lowe. Astor was loaned from Warner Bros., for the film.

Samuel L. Rothafel selected the film for the feature for the first anniversary of the New York City Roxy Theatre.

Plot
The gang of a mob boss grow suspicious of his new girlfriend. She's a beautiful young girl and they don't believe she would actually associate with the mob and wonder if she's really a police "plant". The mobsters dress nattily to not appear "out of place" in the ritzy neighborhoods prior to a heist.

Cast

 Edmund Lowe - Mile-Away Barry
 Mary Astor - Jeanne
 Ben Bard  - Nick
 Bob Perry - Ritzy Logan7
 Joe Brown - as himself  
 Tom Dugan - Silky Levine
 John Kelly - Biff Simpson
 Robert Emmett O'Connor - Detective Gilroy
 R. O. Pennell - Professor
 Ed Brady - singing waiter  
 Charles Morton - Jeanne's sweetheart
 Harry Dunkinson - uncredited
 Florence Wix - dressmaker (uncredited)

Response
The New York Times review stated - "Edmund Lowe is capital as the well-tailored Barry. Mr. Barry likes a good round of golf on the day following a fruitful burglary. Mary Astor is charming as Jean and R. O. Pennell makes the most of the "Professor's" rôle.".

References
"New York Times" review March 12, 1928

External links
 

1928 films
American silent feature films
Fox Film films
Films directed by Irving Cummings
American gangster films
1928 crime drama films
American crime drama films
American black-and-white films
1920s American films
Silent American drama films
1920s English-language films